Beer in Azerbaijan is typified by lighter lagers. Of the domestically produced beers, the most widely distributed is Xirdalan, formerly brewed by Baki-Castel (BGI) but bought by Baltika in 2008. As a sponsor of Baku's Eurovision Song Contest, Xirdalan issued special commemorative Eurovision cans and bottles in 2012. Other relatively widespread brands include Novxanı (brewed by Bakı-Praqa) and NZS. Beer drinking is growing in popularity in Azerbaijan. Unlike almost all CIS countries, the beer bottles in Azerbaijan are marked with excise duty sticker.

See also

 Azerbaijani wine
 Beer and breweries by region

References

External links
RateBeer on Xirdalan

 
Azerbaijani cuisine